Harmony is the eighth studio album by American country music artist John Conlee. It was released in 1986 via Columbia Records. The album includes the singles "Harmony", "Got My Heart Set on You" and "The Carpenter".

Track listing

Personnel
Adapted from liner notes.

Eddie Bayers - drums
Dennis Burnside - keyboards
Mark Casstevens - acoustic guitar
John Conlee - lead vocals, background vocals
Hoot Hester - fiddle
Randy McCormick - keyboards
Joe Osborn - bass guitar
Lloyd Green - steel guitar
Brent Rowan - electric guitar
Larry Sasser - steel guitar
Wendy Suits - background vocals
Judy Taylor - background vocals
Dennis Wilson - background vocals

Chart performance

References

1986 albums
John Conlee albums
Columbia Records albums